Megalomania is the second album released by Norwegian black metal band Enslavement of Beauty in 2001. The song "And to Temptation's Darkness Forever Abide" was added to the expanded version, where the track order also is different. All music composed by Tony Eugene Tunheim, all lyrics written by Ole Alexander Myrholt.

Track listing

"Dainty Delusive Doll" – 4:05
"The Venial Blur" - 3:22
"Late Night, Red Wine Blight" - 4:12
"Malignant Midwinter Murders" - 4:22
"Comme Il Faut" - 4:51
"Benign Bohemian Brilliance" - 3:55
"Prudence Kept Her Purity" - 3:34
"Seven Dead Orchids" - 3:06
"The Dying Buds of May" - 4:53
"Fifteen Minutes" - 5:38
"Ye That Tempteth, Ye That Bequeth" - 4:00
"C17-H19-NO3-H2O" - 3:12
"Tangled in Grand Affection" - 3:46
"Crowd of Mourners" - 3:58

Musicians
 Ole Alexander Myrholt - Vocals
 Tony Eugene Tunheim - Guitar, Keyboard
 Asgeir Mickelson - Drums
 Hans-Aage Holmen - Bass
 Julie Johnson - Vocals

Other personnel
 Sten Brian Tunheim - Cover Art
 Fred Endresen - Effects

External links
 MySpace
 Ecyclopaedia Metallum

2001 albums
Enslavement of Beauty albums